Laneco was a supermarket chain operating in eastern Pennsylvania and northern New Jersey. At one time it operated four types of stores. The older stores were called Food Lane, which were former Food Fair stores with the least square footage and only carried food products. There were also Laneco's and Laneco SuperCenters (The Clinton, NJ store was known as a "Laneco Dept Store") these stores were much larger than Food Lanes and offered general merchandise. Sam Walton actually worked with Raymond A. Bartolacci Sr. to develop the Wal-Mart Supercenter. Laneco also operated CR Pharmacies which were often located in Laneco Supercenters.

History

Laneco was founded by Raymond A. Bartolacci Sr. in 1946. The first store opened as Paramount Foods in Easton, Pennsylvania, and completed its first day of business with a total of less than $20 in sales. The stores were acquired by Supervalu in October 1992, and were closed by them in 2001. The stores were scaled down for the last several years until they were closed. The stores operated with a union and several thousand employees were laid off at the closure of the stores. Laneco had around 16 stores at the time of closure. Many stores were purchased by and converted to Giant such as the Lehighton, PA location, while Redner's picked up a few locations, Country Junction took over the Wind Gap store, Ahart's Market operated a few locations such as the former Food Lanes in Allentown and Bethlehem PA and Phillipsburg, NJ (all of which have since closed). The Clinton and the Whitehouse (now closed) SuperCenters in New Jersey are now Wal-Mart stores and the Laneco in Phillipsburg was demolished, with a Wal-Mart, a White Castle, a Wawa, and a Quaker Steak & Lube which got replaced by Stone Tavern now occupying the redeveloped site. The Hometown, PA Laneco would become a TJ Bart's location before eventually closing and the lot being used to build a Wal-Mart. Giant refused to hire any of the ex-Laneco workers because they were members of a union.
In 1997 TJ Bart's acquired the Laneco in Southside Easton and eventually selling it to C-town in 2006.

Products
Laneco carried a store brand of many grocery products called Why Pay More?. The logo for Why Pay More? items was a smiling woman holding a receipt in her left hand and cash in her right, the latter presumably having been spared by the former.

References

Laneco Food Lane Supermarkets at web.archive.org

Defunct supermarkets of the United States
Defunct discount stores of the United States